Dhunyanun Premwaew (born July 20, 1987), formerly Chonnapas Premwaew, is a Thai taekwondo practitioner.

External links
 
 

Living people
Dhunyanun Premwaew
Dhunyanun Premwaew
Taekwondo practitioners at the 2008 Summer Olympics
Asian Games medalists in taekwondo
Taekwondo practitioners at the 2002 Asian Games
Taekwondo practitioners at the 2006 Asian Games
Taekwondo practitioners at the 2010 Asian Games
1987 births
Dhunyanun Premwaew
Dhunyanun Premwaew
Medalists at the 2002 Asian Games
Medalists at the 2006 Asian Games
Medalists at the 2010 Asian Games
Universiade medalists in taekwondo
Dhunyanun Premwaew
Dhunyanun Premwaew
Southeast Asian Games medalists in taekwondo
Competitors at the 2005 Southeast Asian Games
Universiade silver medalists for Thailand
World Taekwondo Championships medalists
Asian Taekwondo Championships medalists
Dhunyanun Premwaew
Dhunyanun Premwaew